Shree Holy Family Higher Secondary English Medium School is a high school in Bhimdatta, western Nepal, close to the border with India.

References 

Secondary schools in Nepal